Tungussogyrinus is an extinct genus of temnospondyl amphibian in the family Branchiosauridae. It has been assigned to its own subfamily, Tungussogyrininae.

References

Branchiosaurids
Permian temnospondyls
Triassic temnospondyls
Fossils of Russia
Taxa named by Ivan Yefremov
Fossil taxa described in 1939
Prehistoric amphibian genera